North & South Esk Regional, commonly abbreviated to N.S.E.R., is one of five public, English language high schools in the Miramichi Area. It also functions as a middle school. I is located in Sunny Corner, New Brunswick. It serves principally residents from Sunny Corner, Red Bank, Sevogle, Sillikers, and Cassilis. The school serves grades 7 to 12. Graduating class sizes range from the opening year (1952) of 5 students, to 70+ students in the 1970s. It currently has around 190 students.

Notable Events
In 2012 after being principal for less than a year Kirk Matheson was arrested after pleading guilty to sex crimes involving children. Kirk, 37, was the principal and volleyball coach at North and South Esk Regional when he posed as a 19-year-old woman (Jillian) on Facebook and enticed two boys to send him nude photos and video of themselves.

References

1952 establishments in New Brunswick
Educational institutions established in 1952
High schools in New Brunswick
Schools in Northumberland County, New Brunswick
Sex crimes in Canada